Nele Jansegers (born 1965) is a Belgian politician and a member of the Vlaams Belang. She was elected as a member of the Belgian Senate in 2007.

Notes

1965 births
Living people
Members of the Senate (Belgium)
People from Aalst, Belgium
Vlaams Belang politicians
21st-century Belgian politicians